The 2020–21 Russian Football National League was the 29th season of Russia's second-tier football league since the dissolution of the Soviet Union. The season began on August 1, 2020 and end in 15 May 2021.

Stadia by capacity

Team changes

To FNL
 Promoted from PFL
 Akron
 Dynamo Bryansk
 Irtysh Omsk
 Veles Moscow
 Volgar Astrakhan
 Alania Vladikavkaz

 Relegated from Premier League
 Krylia Sovetov Samara
 Orenburg

From FNL
 Relegated to PFL
 Avangard Kursk

 Demoted to lower divisions
 Luch Vladivostok
 Armavir

 Unable to pay for licensing
 Mordovia

 Promoted to Premier League
 Khimki
 Rotor Volgograd

Stadia by locations

League table

Results

Season statistics

Top goalscorers

References

2020–21 in Russian football leagues
Russian First League seasons
Russian